Pararheinheimera chironomi is a Gram-negative and aerobic bacterium from the genus of Pararheinheimera.

References 

Chromatiales
Bacteria described in 2007